Gert Arne Blomé (28 August 1934 – 27 January 2021) was a Swedish ice hockey player. He competed at the 1960 and 1964 Olympics and finished in fifth and second place, respectively. At the world championships he won one gold (1962), two silver (1963 and 1967) and two bronze medals (1958, 1967). He was a European champion in 1962, finished second in 1958, 1963, 1964 and 1967 and third in 1959–1961 and 1965.

Blomé started to play with Gävle IK in 1956 and won a national title next year. In 1961 he moved to Västra Frölunda IF and won another Swedish title in 1965, receiving the Goldpucken Award as the best Swedish player. He was selected to the Swedish all-star team in 1961, 1962, 1965 and 1967 and was awarded the Stora Grabbars Märke #55.

He died in January 2021 at the age of 86.

References

External links

1934 births
2021 deaths
Frölunda HC players
Ice hockey players at the 1960 Winter Olympics
Ice hockey players at the 1964 Winter Olympics
Medalists at the 1964 Winter Olympics
Olympic ice hockey players of Sweden
Olympic medalists in ice hockey
Olympic silver medalists for Sweden
People from Gävle
Sportspeople from Gävleborg County